Paterina is a genus of brachiopods known from the Middle Cambrian Burgess Shale. 18 specimens of Paterina are known from the Greater Phyllopod bed, where they comprise 0.03% of the community.

References

External links 
 

Burgess Shale fossils
Prehistoric brachiopod genera
Paleozoic life of Nova Scotia

Cambrian genus extinctions